The Valley River is a river in Southwestern Manitoba, Canada, whose valley separates the Duck Mountains from the Riding Mountains. It drains an area of approximately 2880 km2.

The river begins in the Duck Mountains and then descends into its valley where it passes through Tootinaowaziibeeng Treaty Reserve, Grandview, and Gilbert Plains before emptying into Dauphin Lake.

In 1889, the Shaw Brothers Lumber Company opened a flour mill and a sawmill on the river.

References 

Rivers of Manitoba

Bodies of water of Parkland Region, Manitoba